Midnight Madness is the second studio album by American rock band Night Ranger, released on October 26, 1983 on MCA Records. The album produced three charting singles and contains the band's best known hit, "Sister Christian." It remains their highest selling album at over a million copies sold in the US.

Singles 
The first single/video, "(You Can Still) Rock in America" peaked at number 51 in early 1984 on Billboard's Hot 100 chart and also reached number 15 on Billboard's Mainstream Rock Tracks chart. "Sister Christian" peaked at number 5 on Billboard's Hot 100 and was one of the most played videos of 1984. The song also has been featured in several films including Boogie Nights and Rock of Ages among others. "When You Close Your Eyes" was the third single/video and reached number 14 on Billboard's Hot 100 chart and number 7 on Billboard's Mainstream Rock Tracks Chart. The 1984 CD release contains a slightly different recording of the track. "Rumours in the Air" also charted on the Billboard Mainstream Rock chart peaking at number 26 in the spring of 1984.

Track listing

Personnel
Night Ranger
Jack Blades – bass, lead vocals
Brad Gillis – guitars, vocals
Jeff Watson – guitars, vocals
Alan Fitzgerald – keyboards
Kelly Keagy – drums, lead vocals

Additional musicians
Glenn Hughes – backing vocals on "(You Can Still) Rock in America"

Production
Pat Glasser – producer
John Van Nest – engineer
Brian Gardner – mastering

Charts

Album

Singles

Certifications

References

Further reading

1983 albums
Night Ranger albums
MCA Records albums